1991 Emmy Awards may refer to:

 43rd Primetime Emmy Awards, the 1991 Emmy Awards ceremony honoring primetime programming
 18th Daytime Emmy Awards, the 1991 Emmy Awards ceremony honoring daytime programming
 19th International Emmy Awards, the 1991 Emmy Awards ceremony honoring international programming

Emmy Award ceremonies by year